Montesquieu (Languedocien: Montesquiu) is a commune in the Hérault department in the Occitanie region in southern France.

Geography 

The original village of Montesquieu is in ruins. The commune has a number of hamlets: Mas Rolland, which has the town hall and the old school, Paders, near the valley of the Peyne, Fournols to the north of the commune and Valuzières towards the middle.

Population

See also
Communes of the Hérault department

References

Communes of Hérault